The Miners Advocate and Northumberland Recorder was a bi-weekly English language newspaper published in Newcastle, New South Wales.

History
The newspaper was first published in 1873 by founder John Miller Sweet. It was one of two newspapers published in the area, The Newcastle Chronicle and Hunter River District News being the other.

The paper ceased publication in 1876, with the commencement of The Newcastle Herald (originally published as the Newcastle Morning Herald and Miners Advocate).

Archives
The newspaper is available on microfilm at the State Library of New South Wales. On 11 Feb 2014, the National Library of Australia, under its Newspaper Digitisation Program, began adding issues to its digital collection.

See also 
 List of newspapers in Australia

External links

References

Defunct newspapers published in New South Wales
Mass media in Newcastle, New South Wales